William Sykes (24 July 1861 – 24 August 1930), born Barrow-in-Furness, was first Curate of St John's Church, Tunbrdige Wells; Vicar of Hillsborough and Wadsley Bridge, Sheffield, 1895–1919; Vicar of Audley, Staffordshire, 1919–1928; first President of the Sovereign Grace Union 1913–1930.

He married Anne Jane Dodgson, 1885, who died in 1916; they had five sons and three daughters, including the clergyman William Dodgson-Sykes. He then married Emily Bartlett Knocker, in 1918, who survived him.

References

1. 

1861 births
1930 deaths
People from Barrow-in-Furness
20th-century English Anglican priests